In the Blood is a 2016 Danish drama film directed by Rasmus Heisterberg. It was selected to be screened in the Discovery section at the 2016 Toronto International Film Festival. At the 2017 Bodil Awards, it won Best Film and Victoria Carmen Sonne won Best Supporting Actress.

Cast 
  as Emilie
  as Esben
  as Knud
  as Rune
 Kristoffer Bech as Simon
 Aske Bang as Søren
  as Overlæge

References

External links 
 

2016 drama films
2016 films
Best Danish Film Bodil Award winners
Danish drama films
2010s Danish-language films
Scanbox Entertainment films